A rock opera is a collection of rock music songs with lyrics that relate to a common story. Rock operas are typically released as concept albums and are not scripted for acting, which distinguishes them from operas, although several have been adapted as rock musicals. The use of various character roles within the song lyrics is a common storytelling device. The success of the rock opera genre has inspired similar works in other musical styles, such as rap opera.

History 
A number of rock artists became interested in the idea of creating a rock opera in the 1960s. In an early use of the term, the July 4, 1966, edition of RPM Magazine (published in Toronto) reported that "Bruce Cockburn and Mr [William] Hawkins are working on a Rock Opera, operating on the premise that to write you need only 'something to say'." Mark Wirtz explored the idea in a project A Teenage Opera, from which an early song "Excerpt from A Teenage Opera (Grocer Jack)" recorded by Keith West was released and became a hit song in 1967. However, the album for the rock opera was not released until 1996, and it was only fully realised and staged in 2017.

Colin Fleming of The Atlantic described The Story of Simon Simopath (1967) by British psychedelic band Nirvana as an "early foray into the rock opera sub-genre". Neil Strauss of The New York Times wrote that S.F. Sorrow (1968) by The Pretty Things is "generally acknowledged as the first rock opera".

Scott Mervis of the Pittsburgh Post-Gazette wrote that The Who's 1969 record Tommy was the first album to be billed as a rock opera. The album tells the story of Tommy Walker, a "deaf, dumb and blind kid." Tommy displays the titular character's experiences with life and his relationship with his family. Although the band's guitarist Pete Townshend denied taking any influence from S.F. Sorrow, critics have compared Tommy to it. The Tommy album developed into other media, including a Seattle Opera production in 1971, an orchestral version by Lou Reizner in 1972, a film in 1975, and a Broadway musical in 1992. The original album has sold 20 million copies and has been inducted into the Grammy Hall of Fame. Tommy would also go on to influence On and On, a rap opera by The Fat Boys and American Idiot, a punk rock opera by Green Day, the latter of whom having made 21st Century Breakdown, another rock opera. The Who had previously toyed with the concepts which would lead to the full-blown rock opera with their six-movement 1966 track "A Quick One, While He's Away".

A rock opera that experienced commercial recording and Broadway success is Jesus Christ Superstar (1970), written by Andrew Lloyd Webber and Tim Rice, and in respect of which Lloyd Webber said "the piece was written as a rock album from the outset and set out from the start to tell the story through the music itself."

The Rocky Horror Show is a rock musical by Richard O'Brien. A humorous tribute to the science fiction and horror B movies of the 1930s through to the early 1960s, the musical tells the story of a newly engaged couple getting caught in a storm and coming to the home of a mad transvestite scientist, Dr Frank-N-Furter, unveiling his new creation, a sort of Frankenstein-style monster in the form of an artificially made, fully grown, physically perfect muscle man named Rocky. The show was produced and directed by Jim Sharman. The original London production of the musical premiered at the Royal Court Theatre (Upstairs) on 19 June 1973 (after two previews on 16 and 18 June 1973). It later moved to several other locations in London and closed on 13 September 1980. The show ran for a total of 2,960 performances and won the 1973 Evening Standard Theatre Award for Best Musical. Various international productions of the musical have since spanned across six continents as well as West End and Broadway revivals and eight UK tours. Actor Tim Curry, who originated the role of Dr. Frank-N-Furter in the original London production, became particularly associated with the musical. The musical was adapted into the 1975 film The Rocky Horror Picture Show, starring O'Brien as Riff Raff, with Curry also reprising his role; the movie has the longest-running release in cinematic history and is considered one of the most recognizable cult films of all time. In 2016, it was adapted into the television film The Rocky Horror Picture Show: Let's Do the Time Warp Again.

A Night at the Opera is a studio album by the British rock band Queen, released on 21 November 1975. Produced by Roy Thomas Baker and Queen, it was reportedly the most expensive album ever recorded at the time of its release. Queen employed a complex production that extensively used multitrack recording, and the songs on the album incorporated a wide range of styles, such as ballads, music hall, dixieland, hard rock and progressive rock influences. Aside from their usual equipment, Queen also utilized a diverse range of instruments such as a double bass, harp, ukulele and more, correlating the album's music with that of a typical operatic performance. The album's most famous track, "Bohemian Rhapsody," was referred to by lead singer Freddie Mercury as a "mock opera" that resulted from the combination of three songs he had written. The song parodies elements of opera with bombastic choruses, sarcastic recitative, and distorted Italian operatic phrases. Lyrical references include Scaramouche, the fandango, Galileo Galilei, Figaro, and Beelzebub, with cries of "Bismillah!"

Bat Out of Hell is an epic rock album by Meat Loaf that remains one of the best-selling albums of all time, having sold over 50 million copies worldwide. It is certified 14× Platinum by the Recording Industry Association of America (RIAA). As of June 2019, it has spent 522 weeks in the UK Albums Chart, the second longest chart run by a studio album. Rolling Stone ranked it at number 343 on its list of the 500 Greatest Albums of All Time. A musical based on Bat Out of Hell, staged by Jay Scheib, opened at the Manchester Opera House in 2017. The album's producer, Jim Steinman, coined the term Wagnerian rock after composer Richard Wagner to describe the genre of the record.

Perhaps the archetypal and most famous rock opera is The Wall, a double album released by Pink Floyd in 1979. The Wall chronicles the story of Pink, a character who ultimately constructs an emotional wall to protect himself after being driven into insanity as a result of traumatic life experiences. The album was included in Rolling Stones lists of the greatest albums of all time in 2003, 2012, and 2020. James Guthrie, the album's engineer, won the 1980 Grammy award for Best Engineered Recording (non-classical), and the album was nominated for the Grammy Award for Album of the Year. The album was subsequently made into a 1982 film entitled Pink Floyd – The Wall. An elaborate 1980-1981 concert tour was conducted by the band after the album's release and bassist Roger Waters reincarnated the tour twice; once in Berlin in 1990 to commemorate the fall of the Berlin Wall and again around the world from 2010-2013, a series of shows that became the highest-grossing tour by a solo musician. Both The Wall and the music of Queen inspired the rock band My Chemical Romance to create their own rock opera, the 2006 album The Black Parade.

In 1999 progressive metal band Dream Theater released their album Metropolis Pt. 2: Scenes from a Memory, which has been regarded as Rock Opera. The album tells the story of Nicholas, a man getting flashbacks from a previous life, as he undergoes hypnosis sessions to recall the memories of Victoria, a young girl who he discovers was murdered as a violent result of a love affair.

In an effort to appeal to more modern audiences, opera companies have welcomed more pop and rock influences. The resulting rock operas have met varying degrees of success as the worlds of high art and low art mix. In Russian music, the term zong-opera (Зонг-опера) is sometimes used, since the first Soviet-Russian rock-opera Orpheus and Eurydice was described with this term, though the term "rock-opera" was already known in the Soviet rock music circles.

Style 

According to Fleming, rock operas are more akin to a cantata or suite, because they are not usually acted out.  Similarly, Andrew Clements of The Guardian called Tommy a subversively-labeled musical.  Clements states that lyrics drive rock operas, which makes them not a true form of opera.  Responding to accusations that rock operas are pretentious and overblown, Pete Townshend wrote that pop music by its very nature rejects such characteristics and is an inherently simple form. Townshend said that the only goal of pop music is to reach audiences, and rock operas are merely one more way to do so. Peter Kiesewalter, on the other hand, said that rock music and opera are "both overblown, massive spectacles" that cover the same themes.  Kiesewalter, who was originally not a fan of opera, did not think the two styles would mix well together, but his modernized operas with rock music surprised him with their popularity at the East Village Opera Company.

The performance of these works on Broadway has also courted controversy; Anne Midgette of The New York Times called them musicals with "no more than the addition of a keyboard and a drum set".

Rock opera albums typically follow themes, a trait similarly held in a concept album. Rock operas may also include a central character to progress the album's tracks via a specific storyline. For example, Tommy by The Who follows the life experiences and family relationships with the titular character, The Wall by Pink Floyd chronicles the building of a metaphorical wall by the protagonist named Pink and The Black Parade by My Chemical Romance tells the tale of "The Patient" struck by cancer.

See also 
 Album era
 Concept album
 List of rock musicals
 The Survival of St. Joan
 Trans-Siberian Orchestra
 True Symphonic Rockestra
 Wagnerian rock

References

External links
 

Musical theatre
 
1960s neologisms
Opera